The 11th Kansas Infantry Regiment was an infantry regiment that served in the Union Army during the American Civil War.

Service
The 11th Kansas Infantry was organized at Camp Lyon near Fort Leavenworth, Kansas, from August 29 through September 14, 1862. It mustered in on April 3, 1862, for three years under the command of Colonel Thomas Ewing Jr.

The regiment moved to Fort Scott, Kansas, October 4–9, 1862, then to Pea Ridge, Arkansas, October 15–19. It was attached to 1st Brigade, 1st Division, Army of the Frontier, Department of Missouri, to February 1863. District of Rolla, Department of Missouri and District of Kansas, Department of Missouri, to April 1863.

The 11th Kansas Infantry ceased to exist at the end of April 1863 when it was mounted and changed to the 11th Kansas Cavalry.

Detailed service
Action at Old Fort Wayne or Beattie's Prairie, near Maysville, October 22, 1862. Cane Hill, Boston Mountains, November 28. Boston Mountains December 4–6. Reed's Mountain December 6. Battle of Prairie Grove December 7. Expedition over Boston Mountains to Van Buren December 27–31. Moved to Springfield, Missouri, January 1863, and duty there until February 17. Moved to Forsyth, Missouri, then to Fort Scott, Kansas. On furlough March. Moved from Fort Scott to Salem, Missouri, then to Kansas City, Missouri, April 6–20.

Commanders
 Colonel Thomas Ewing Jr.

Notable members
 Captain Henry Booth - organized Pawnee County, Kansas, and later became Speaker of the Kansas House of Representatives
 2nd Lieutenant Preston B. Plumb - U.S. Senator from Kansas (1877–1891)
 Private John C. Rooks - killed at the battle of Prairie Grove; Rooks County, Kansas, is named in his honor
 Captain Edmund Ross - U.S. Senator from Kansas (1866–1870)

See also

 11th Regiment Kansas Volunteer Cavalry
 List of Kansas Civil War Units
 Kansas in the Civil War

References

Further reading
Encyclopedia of Arkansas
Engagement at Cane Hill
Skirmish at Reed's Mountain
Battle of Prairie Grove

Attribution
 

Military units and formations established in 1862
Military units and formations disestablished in 1863
Units and formations of the Union Army from Kansas
1862 establishments in Kansas